or  for short is an Ainu kamuy (god) and culture hero.  In Ainu mythology, he is credited with teaching humans domestic skills, and for this reason he is called Ainurakkur (アイヌラックㇽ, father of the Ainu or father of humanity), and otherwise known as Okikurmi.

Names 

Aynurakkur and Okikurmi may have originally been distinguished, but seem to have become conflated after a body of similarly plotted narratives became attached to them.

Etymology 

Oyna-kamuy literally signifies "god who is passed on (in lore)" (Kindaichi) or "god of the sacred tradition, oyna" (Donald Philippi). But the name has also construed to mean "god who engages/participates in shamanism " by Chiri)".

The Ae- prefix is "we", thus Ae-oyna-kamuy means "god whom we pass on (in our lore)" or "god concerning whom we sing the oyna". In formal grammatical terms, Ae-oyna-kamuy has also explained as a morphological derivation with the addition of a "pronominal affix" (prefix).

Ainurakkur, signifies "he who has a human smell". The name, which contains the element rak meaning "smells of~", is literally "human who smells like human" hence "humanlike person" according to Kindaichi. The implication is that this is a half-god, half-human (Ainu:arke ainu arke kamui) being or divinity, as explained by Kindaichi and his disciple . While the term kur strictly means "person", various glossators take this implicitly to mean a deity, as is the case with Chiri and others.

Okikurmi is glossed as "he (who) wears a fur/leather robe with a shiny hem" by Chiri.

Depiction
Ae-oyna-kamuy is described as a large man wreathed in smoke.  When the smoke parts, he is seen to be surrounded by flames from his waist to his feet, and wearing a coat of elm bark and a sword.  He also wields a magical spear of mugwort. The flames he is wreathed in indicate his virtuous character.

Mythology
There are a number of myths of Ae-oyna-kamuy's origin, arising from different Ainu tribes.  He is said to be begotten by Pakor-kamuy (the god of the year or the god of smallpox) on an elm tree (Chikisani) on Mount Oputateshike according to a version collected at Shiunkot village, while other traditions name the father as the sun or thunder.

Ae-oyna-kamuy is taught by Kamuy-huci, the hearth deity, and descends from the heavens to impart his knowledge to humanity.  He is responsible for teaching weaving to the Ainu women and carving to the men.  He is credited with teaching techniques of fishing, hunting, gathering, architecture, medicine, and religious ritual, and is associated with law and singing.  He also fights several battles on behalf of humanity; in one instance, he destroys a personification of famine with his spear of mugwort, then creates herds of deer and schools of fish from the snow on his snowshoes.

Eventually, Ae-oyna-kamuy, disappointed at the decline of the Ainu, departs for another country; some myths say he returns to the heavens.

In one myth, when he returns to the heavens, the gods send him back because he reeks of humans.  Then he leaves his clothes on earth in order to return. It is said that his old sandals turned into the first squirrels.

Explanatory notes

References
Citations

Bibliography

 

 
 

 Etter, Carl. Ainu Folklore: Traditions and Culture of the Vanishing Aborigines of Japan. Chicago: Wilcox and Follett, 1949.

 

 

 

 

Ainu kamuy
Textiles in folklore